The following is media and release information for the MegaMan NT Warrior anime and manga series, known in Japan as . The former is composed of five anime series (EXE, Axess, Stream, Beast, Beast+) and one feature-length film. The anime series began on March 4, 2002 in Japan, and EXE and Axess were subsequently adapted in English, airing May 17, 2003.

The film, Rockman EXE: Program of Light and Dark, aired in Japan on March 12, 2005.

DVD & VHS releases

In Japan, every episode of the anime has been released across sixty-five DVDs usually containing three episodes per disc. In the United States, thirteen DVDs have been released covering the original 52 episodes of EXE. The first six volumes were also released in VHS form. Currently, there are no plans to release the English version of Axess on DVD.

Theme songs

Opening themes

Ending themes

Other themes

Soundtracks

Sound Navigation 01

This soundtrack contains background music and a few theme songs from the first Area of the original EXE series. Although the soundtrack's title implies a second Sound Navigation may have been released, one was never announced, possibly due to poor sales.

Rockman's Theme: Break Through the Wind (TV-Sized)  (1:28) 
N1 Grand Prix Commencement Compilation  (1:34) 
Enzan  (2:22) 
Program Advance  (2:22) 
Battle Parade  (2:12) 
Plug-In! Rockman (version 1)  (2:00) 
Aggressor  (1:32) 
Grand Prix Battle  (1:59) 
Suspense  (2:00) 
Destiny's Door  (1:50) 
Charge! Commander Beef  (1:41) 
N1 Grand Prix Fierce Fight Compilation  (1:40) 
Net Battle  (1:14) 
Cruising  (0:52) 
Battle Pressure  (2:28) 
Plug-In! Rockman! (version 2)  (1:35) 
Chase!  (1:18) 
There Goes the Dashing Masa  (1:14) 
Tranquil Afternoon  (0:54) 
Oriental Magic  (1:51) 
Comical  (1:49) 
Elec 'n' Rock  (1:17) 
Fires of the World  (1:25) 
Netto  (1:13) 
WWW Theme  (1:29) 
Mystery  (0:40) 
Labyrinth  (1:22) 
Upper-Class Society  (0:44) 
Rockman's Theme: Break Through the Wind (Ballad)  (2:17) 
Rockman's Theme: Break Through the Wind (BGM)  (1:28) 
Piece of Peace (TV-Sized)  (1:34) 
Bonus Track: Enzan (Mark 1)  (1:37) 
Bonus Track: Program Advance (Mark 1)  (2:22) 
Bonus Track: Plug-In! Rockman! (Mark 1)  (1:27)

Vocal Album

This album contains every opening and closing theme song from EXE through Beast as well as two bonus songs available in the first print of the album (indicated by the asterisk beside the track listing). However, most of the songs are in their broadcast TV-Sized lengths, presumably because full-length versions were never recorded.

Rockman's Theme: Break Through the Wind (Jin Hashimoto) (from EXE; 4:28)
Piece of Peace (TV-Sized) (Mika) (from EXE; 1:34)
begin the TRY (Showtaro Morikubo) (from EXE; 3:27)
Two Futures (TV-Sized) (Michihiro Kuroda) (from Axess; 1:30)
At the Place Where Light Reaches (TV-Sized) (Kumiko Higa and Akiko Kimura as Netto and Rockman) (from Axess; 1:29)
Be Somewhere (Buzy (band)) (from Stream; 4:59)
Doobee Doowop Communication (babamania) (from Stream; 3:55)
At the Place Where Light Reaches - Symbol of Friendship (TV-Sized) (Kumiko Higa and Akiko Kimura as Netto and Rockman) (from Stream; 1:30)
Song of Victory (Dandelion) (from Beast; 4:12)
Footprints (Clair) (from Beast; 4:50)
Heart Wave (TV-Sized) (Misato Fukuen as Misora) (from Mega Man Star Force; 1:02) *
Install Your HEART (Sakura Nogawa as Aki) (from EXE; 1:50) *

Episode list

The anime is composed of five series: EXE (56 episodes), Axess (51), Stream (51), Beast (25), Beast+ (26), and one feature-film. The anime series began on March 4, 2002 in Japan, and EXE and Axess were subsequently adapted in English, airing May 17, 2003. Currently, there are no plans for English adaptations of Stream, Beast, Beast+, or the movie.

Manga publication
 Japan: Shogakukan's CoroCoro Comic
 United States and Canada: VIZ Media

References and notes
 XEBEC's Rockman EXE Stream anime page
 XEBEC's Rockman EXE Beast anime page
 XEBEC's Rockman EXE Beast+ anime page

MegaMan NT Warrior
Mega Man Battle Network

ja:ロックマンエグゼ
pt:Megaman NT Warrior